Guillaume Kigbafori Soro (born 8 May 1972) is an Ivorian politician who was the Prime Minister of Côte d'Ivoire from April 2007 to March 2012. Prior to his service as Prime Minister, Soro led the Patriotic Movement of Côte d'Ivoire, and later the New Forces as its Secretary-General. In March 2012, Soro became President of the National Assembly of Côte d'Ivoire. He stepped down from that position in February 2019, announcing in June 2019 that he is running to succeed President Alassane Ouattara.

Biography 
Soro is a Sénoufo from Ferkessédougou (northern Côte d'Ivoire) and is of the Catholic faith. Father of 4 children, he shares his life with Sylvie Tagro. His father was a member of the Democratic Party of Côte d'Ivoire (PDCI).

Ivorian Civil War

Soro led the Patriotic Movement of Côte d'Ivoire (MPCI) in a September 2002 rebellion against President Laurent Gbagbo that triggered the Ivorian Civil War. In December 2002 Soro's MPCI combined with two other rebel groups, the Ivorian Popular Movement of the Great West (MPIGO) and the Movement for Justice and Peace (MJP), to form the New Forces (Forces Nouvelles de Côte d'Ivoire). He was appointed Secretary-General of the New Forces.

Political career
Following a peace agreement in January 2003, Soro was appointed to the government as Minister of Communications. The New Forces ministers began a boycott of cabinet meetings in September 2003, returning in January 2004. After an opposition demonstration held in Abidjan in March 2004 was violently broken up, President Gbagbo dismissed Soro and two other ministers from their positions. Soro denounced the dismissals, saying they were effectively a coup by Gbagbo against the peace agreement. On 9 August 2004 Soro was reinstated.

On 28 December 2005, Soro was appointed Minister of Reconstruction and Reintegration by Prime Minister Charles Konan Banny. He attended his first cabinet meeting in this capacity on 15 March 2006.

Prime Minister
Following a peace deal signed on 4 March 2007, Soro was considered a possible candidate for Prime Minister and received Gbagbo's endorsement. In an interview published on 26 March, Soro said that he would be willing to assume the position. Gbagbo officially appointed him on 29 March, Soro took office on 4 April, and his 32 ministers were named on 7 April, many of whom served under his predecessor.

In a speech on 13 April, Soro apologized "to everybody and on behalf of everybody" for the harm caused by the rebellion. On 30 July, Soro and Gbagbo participated in a "peace flame" disarmament ceremony, which involved the burning  of weapons to symbolize the end of the conflict.

The peace agreement barred Soro from standing in the 2010 presidential election, and he told Jeune Afrique in a March 2008 interview that he would discuss his political future after the election. It was rumored that Soro and Gbagbo made a secret agreement whereby Soro would support Gbagbo in the election and, in exchange, Gbagbo would back Soro in the subsequent presidential election. Soro dismissed this as "gossip," describing himself as an "arbiter of the electoral process," and further said the New Forces would not back any candidate and that its members could vote for whomever they wished.

When the Gbagbo-allied Constitutional Council announced their results of the 2010 poll and Gbagbo was sworn in, Soro resigned as prime minister, supporting opposition candidate Alassane Ouattara. Ouattara had been declared the winner by the electoral commission, and he reappointed Soro after taking the oath of office at a rival ceremony.

Soro was elected to the National Assembly in the December 2011 parliamentary election. After serving as Ouattara's prime minister for over a year, Soro resigned on 8 March 2012. He was then elected as President of the National Assembly on 12 March 2012, a move that ensured that he would remain a key figure on the political scene. There were no other candidates for the post.

In 2016 Burkina Faso issued an international arrest warrant for Soro for his alleged role in the 2015 Burkinabé coup d'état.

Standing as the candidate of the ruling coalition, the Rally of Houphouëtists for Democracy and Peace, in the city of Ferkessédougou, Soro was re-elected to the National Assembly in the December 2016 parliamentary election with 98.7% of the vote. When the National Assembly began meeting for the new parliamentary term, Soro was re-elected as President of the National Assembly on 9 January 2017. He received 230 votes from the 252 deputies present; Evariste Méambly, an independent deputy, received 12 votes, and there were 10 spoilt votes.

Assassination attempt
On 29 June 2007, a Fokker 100 carrying Prime Minister Soro, members of his delegation, and 20 journalists was taxiing on a runway at an airport in Bouaké when it was targeted by rocket and Kalashnikov fire. One rocket struck and exploded in the cabin, one missed, and a third bounced off the fuselage and did not detonate. Soro wasn't injured, but four people were killed and ten others wounded. Those who died were Security Chief Drissa Ouattara, the Prime Minister's bodyguard Siaka Diomandé, and Protocole d’Etat members Sékou Doumbia and Souleymane Sérifou. Arrests were subsequently reported.

2020 Ivorian presidential election
Soro stated that he intended to compete in the Ivorian presidential election on 31 October 2020.

On April 29, 2020, Soro was sentenced in absentia to 20 years in prison on charges of embezzling public funds and money laundering.

References

External links
MPCI Official website 
 Review of Guillaume Soro: Pourquoi je suis devenu un rebelle éditions Hachette Littératures (2005).

1971 births
Government ministers of Ivory Coast
Heads of government of Ivory Coast
Ivorian Roman Catholics
Living people
Patriotic Movement of Côte d'Ivoire politicians
Presidents of the National Assembly (Ivory Coast)
Ivorian rebels
People from Savanes District
Ivorian military personnel
Ivory Coast politicians convicted of crimes
21st-century Ivorian politicians